The 1994–95 Croatian Football Cup was the fourth edition of Croatia's football knockout competition. Croatia Zagreb were the defending champions, and the cup was won by Hajduk Split.

Calendar

First round

|}

Second round

|}

Quarter-finals

|}

Semi-finals

First legs

Second legs

Croatia Zagreb won 4–1 on aggregate.

Hajduk Split won 5–1 on aggregate.

Final

First leg

Second leg

Hajduk Split won 4–2 on aggregate.

See also
1994–95 Croatian First Football League

External links
Official website 
1994–95 in Croatian football at Rec.Sport.Soccer Statistics Foundation
1995 Cup Final at Rec.Sport.Soccer Statistics Foundation

Croatian Football Cup seasons
Croatian Cup, 1994-95
Croatian Cup, 1994-95